Nigel William Atherfold (born 13 June 1963) is a former New Zealand rower.

At the 1983 World Rowing Championships at Wedau in Duisburg, Germany, he won a gold medal with the New Zealand eight as the bowman. At the 1986 World Rowing Championships at Nottingham in the United Kingdom, he won a Silver in the men's coxed four with Bruce Holden, Greg Johnston, Chris White, and Andrew Bird as cox.

References

1963 births
Living people
New Zealand male rowers
Rowers at the 1984 Summer Olympics
Olympic rowers of New Zealand
World Rowing Championships medalists for New Zealand
Commonwealth Games medallists in rowing
Commonwealth Games silver medallists for New Zealand
Rowers at the 1986 Commonwealth Games
Medallists at the 1986 Commonwealth Games